Howard Pays (11 June 1927 – 12 April 2002) was an English actor who, in partnership with Freddy Vale, started the London-based talent agency CCA.

Early life
Howard Pays was born in West Ham, Essex on 11 June 1927.

Career
His first television role was playing the part of Bill Norton in the 1955–56 ITV daily soap opera Sixpenny Corner. All 181 episodes have been announced as lost by their producer, BBC Television.

After retiring from acting, he established a talent agency in London with Freddy Vale. The agency did well, representing clients such as actor John Rhys-Davies and cinematographer Tony Pierce-Roberts.

Personal life
Pays met his future wife, Jan Miller, on the set of Sixpenny Corner. One of their daughters, Amanda Pays, also became an actor. They had at least one other child, a daughter called Debra.

His second wife was Lynne.

Pays died on 12 April 2002 in Alton, Hampshire, of cancer.

Filmography

References

External links
 

1927 births
2002 deaths
English male television actors
English male film actors